Teresa is an 1886 novel by the Italian writer Neera, real name Anna Radius Zuccari. The story of the heroine Teresa Caccia has parallels with Zuccari's own early life.

References

1886 novels
Italian novels